Love Lasts Three Years is a 1997 novel by the French writer Frédéric Beigbeder.

Plot
The former dandy Marc Marronnier divorces Anne after three years of marriage. He has fallen in love with Alice and tries to convince her to leave her husband.

Reception
The Daily Telegraph'''s Alastair Sooke compared Love Lasts Three Years to Holiday in a Coma, a 1994 novel by Beigbeder about the same main character. Sooke said it retains "splashes of the acid wit" from the earlier book, but Love Lasts Three Years is a more reflective work with simpler language and fragmentary chapters, which successfully convey the feeling of being in love.

The English translation by Frank Wynne, published in a shared edition with Holiday in a Coma, received the 2008 Scott Moncrieff Prize.

Adaptation
The book was the basis for the 2011 film Love Lasts Three Years'', written and directed by Beigbeder and starring Gaspard Proust.

References

External links
 Grasset
 HarperCollins

1997 French novels
Novels by Frédéric Beigbeder
Éditions Grasset books
French novels adapted into films